Real Succes Chișinău is a football club based in Chișinău, Moldova.

External links
Real Succes Chișinău on divizia-a.md 
Real Succes Chișinău on Soccerway

Football clubs in Moldova
Football clubs in Chișinău
Association football clubs established in 2002
2002 establishments in Moldova